The National Health Laboratory Service (NHLS) is a South African national government institution established in 2001. It was created by merging the South African Institute for Medical Research (SAIMR), the National Centre for Occupational Health and the National Institute for Virology. It also absorbed various provincial health department and university-run pathology laboratories.

The NHLS is the diagnostic pathology service for the public sector in South Africa. A network of 265 laboratories service all public hospitals and clinics in the country.

Divisions and subsidiaries
Besides the network of pathology laboratories operated by the NHLS the institution also has a number of specialist divisions:

National Institute for Communicable Diseases
The National Institute for Communicable Diseases (NICD) was created by combining various structures inherited from the NHLS's parent organisations. The former National Institute for Virology was combined with the former SAIMR's specialist laboratories of microbiology, parasitology, and entomology to create a communicable diseases institute with a public health orientation, comparable to the Centers for Disease Control and Prevention of the United States.

National Institute for Occupational Health
The National Institute for Occupational Health (NIOH) investigates occupational diseases and performs occupational environment analysis through a variety of services which include statutory autopsy, advisory and information services, health hazard evaluation and specialist laboratory services.

The services and units of the NIOH are:
 Analytical Services
 Asbestos Information, Identification, Counting, Monitoring and Evaluation Services
 Autopsy Examination Services
 Bioaerosol Monitoring Unit
 Compensation Service
 Diagnostic Services
 Electron Microscopy Service
 Epidemiology Surveillance
 Ergonomics Unit
 Genotoxicity Assessment Unit
 Health Risk Assessment Unit
 Industrial Toxicology Information Services
 Library Services
 Micro and Nano - Particle Sizing
 Occupational Allergy Unit
 Occupational Health Risk Assessments
 Occupational Hygiene Audits
 Occupational Hygiene Surveys
 Occupational Medicine Referral Clinic
 Particle Toxicology/Nanotoxicology Unit
 Query Handling Service
 Toxicogenomics Unit
 Waterborne Pathogens Unit

National Cancer Registry
The NIOH also manages the National Cancer Registry which is responsible for analysing newly diagnosed cancer cases and to report annual cancer incidence rates. The NCR collects data from public and private histopathology, cytology and haematology laboratories across the whole country.

South African Vaccine Producers
South African Vaccine Producers (SAVP) is a subsidiary of the National Health Laboratory Service (NHLS) responsible for manufacturing vaccines and antivenoms. SAVP's Antivenom Unit is the only manufacturer of antivenom for a number of venomous snakes found in Africa as well as scorpion and spider antivenom.

Training
The NHLS is involved in training all pathologists in South Africa through its partnerships with all nine of the medical schools at South African universities.

Research
The NHLS is involved in pathology and health surveillance research through the pathology laboratories it runs at the medical schools. The partnerships with universities concentrate on a few priority areas; HIV/AIDS, tuberculosis, malaria, occupational health, malnutrition prevention, cervical cancer screening and pneumococcal infections.

Controversy
During 2011 the Treatment Action Campaign, an HIV/AIDS non-governmental organization criticized the national government for allowing the financial viability of the NHLS to be threatened due to the failure of the health departments of Gauteng and Kwa-Zulu Natal to pay the NHLS for services rendered. The financial problems continued into 2012.

References

External links

 

Medical research institutes in South Africa
2001 establishments in South Africa
Government agencies established in 2001